The Ambassador of the United Kingdom to Belarus is the United Kingdom's foremost diplomatic representative in the Republic of Belarus, and head of the UK's diplomatic mission in Minsk.  The official title is His Britannic Majesty's Ambassador to the Republic of Belarus.

History
Until 1991 Belarus was within the Soviet Union. When Belarus became independent at the end of 1991, the British ambassador to Russia was accredited also to Belarus until May 1993 when an office was opened in Minsk, within the German embassy, and for over a year the British Embassy worked out of a single, cramped room with its locally engaged support staff working off a desk lodged beneath the staircase.  In July 1995 new premises were opened in a former geological laboratory, and are now shared between the British and Italian missions.  Some staff, such as the Defence Attaché, are still based in Moscow.

On 10 October 2020, the United Kingdom temporarily recalled its ambassador from Belarus amidst the 2020 Belarusian protests.

List of heads of mission

Ambassadors to Belarus
1992–1993: Sir Brian Fall (ambassador to Russia, accredited to Belarus)
1993–1996: John Everard
1996–1999: Jessica Pearce 
1999–2003: Iain Kelly
2003–2007: Brian Bennett
2007–2008: Michael Haddock
2008–2009: Nigel Gould-Davies
2009–2012: Rosemary Thomas
2012–2016: Bruce Bucknell
2016–2019 Fionna Gibb 

2019–: Jacqueline Perkins

References

External links
UK and Belarus, gov.uk
British Embassy Minsk, gov.uk

Belarus
 
United Kingdom Ambassadors